A Future for the Michel (Eine Zukunft für den Michel) is a compilation album supporting charity by Moya Brennan and Schiller. The album was released in December 2005 to raise money for St. Michel's Church in Hamburg. The compilation features collaborations between the two artists and solo works.

All profits from the compilation have gone to the church in order to have it restored and kept open.

Only a limited number were released.

Track listing
"The Smile" (Schiller with Sarah Brightman)
"Against the Wind" (Moya Brennan)
"Land of Youth" (Moya Brennan)
"Delicately Yours" (Schiller with Kim Sanders)
"River" (Moya Brennan)
"Falling" (Schiller with Moya Brennan)
"Lichtwerk" (Schiller)
"Bright Star" (Moya Brennan)
"Show Me" (Moya Brennan – Schiller Remix)
"Zukunft" (Schiller)

References

2005 compilation albums
Charity albums
Schiller (band) albums
Moya Brennan albums